Kseniya Dobrynina (also written as Ksenia Dobrynina; born 11 January 1994) is a Russian professional racing cyclist, who most recently rode for UCI Women's Continental Team .

Major results

2011
 8th Time trial, UEC European Junior Road Championships

2012
 2nd Time trial, UEC European Junior Road Championships

2013
 2nd Time trial, National Road Championships
 3rd Time trial, UEC European Under-23 Road Championships

2014
 National Road Championships
2nd Time trial
3rd Road race
 2nd GP Sälipark
 6th Grand Prix of Maykop
 7th Time trial, UEC European Under-23 Road Championships
 9th GP Osterhas

2015
 4th Time trial, National Road Championships

2016
 6th Time trial, National Road Championships

2017
 6th Time trial, National Road Championships
 7th Ljubljana–Domžale–Ljubljana
 8th Overall Tour of Chongming Island
 9th Overall Giro Toscana Int. Femminile – Memorial Michela Fanini

2018
 Tour Cycliste Féminin International de l'Ardèche
1st  Sprints classification
1st  Combativity classification
 National Road Championships
4th Time trial
7th Road race

See also
 List of 2016 UCI Women's Teams and riders

References

External links
 

1994 births
Living people
Russian female cyclists
Sportspeople from Voronezh